Anita Gaće (born 14 April 1983) is a Croatian handballer playing for Yenimahalle Bld. SK and the Croatian national team.

After winning many Croatian championship and Croatian cup trophies in the past years, Gaće started the 2011–2012 in superb form. Beside excellent performances on various preparation tournaments, she was selected to the dream team as best right wing of tournament in Metković, where Podravka played against Slovenian champions RK Krim, Montenegrin champions ŽRK Budućnost, Serbian champions RK Zaječar and Macedonian champions ŽRK Metalurg.

Achievements
Women's Regional Handball League
Gold: 2008/2009
Silver: 2009/2010, 2010/2011
Croatian Championship
Gold: 2005/2006, 2006/2007, 2007/2008, 2008/2009, 2009/2010 and 2010/2011
Croatian Cup
Gold: 2005/2006, 2007/2008, 2008/2009, 2009/2010 and 2010/2011

References

External links
 Profile on RK Podravka

1983 births
Living people
Croatian female handball players
Olympic handball players of Croatia
Handball players at the 2012 Summer Olympics
Sportspeople from Split, Croatia
Croatian expatriate sportspeople in Turkey
Expatriate handball players in Turkey
Yenimahalle Bld. SK (women's handball) players
RK Podravka Koprivnica players
21st-century Croatian women